Bassline Boys was a Belgian electronic music group and new beat band, best known for their hit single Warbeat (1989).

History

The group was founded in the late 1980s by Fabian Van Messen and Marc Neuttiens as a new beat band. In 1989 they released their first single, Warbeat, which attracted controversy for sampling Adolf Hitler's voice. While the song was intended as black comedy, not all listeners interpreted it that way. In various clubs, dance acts were developed, where people playbacked and danced to the song, sometimes wearing Nazi uniforms and making the Nazi salute. Some of these dancers were invited to the talkshow Ciel, Mon Mardi, hosted by Christophe Dechavanne to discuss this matter and deny any accusations of Neonazism. Meanwhile, the  real Bassline Boys asked Dechavanne for a right of reply, but this was rejected. Therefore, the band recorded another single, On Se Calme, in which they mocked the controversy by sampling Dechavanne's voice.

In 1990 the Bassline Boys recorded a rap single, Baby B. (Bonjour). When new beat lost its popularity, the group changed to a different genre: eurodance. Their single Magouille (1990) sampled the voice of colorful football trainer Raymond Goethals, while We Will Rock You was a cover of the single of the same name by Queen. By 1992 The Bassline Boys split up.

Discography
 Warbeat (1988)
 On Se Calme (1989) We Will Rock You (1990)
 Baby B. (1990)
 Magouille! (1990)
 De Vuil Janet/ Je Suis Une Grosse Folle (1992). 
 I Deeply Regret That... (Mr. C. Says the Truth)'' (1998).

Sources

External links
 Discogs page.

Belgian electronic music groups
Belgian dance music groups
Belgian new beat music groups
Musical groups established in 1989
Musical groups disestablished in 1992

fr:Bassline Boys